Meiacanthus luteus, the yellow fangbelly, is a species of combtooth blenny found in coral reefs in the western Pacific Ocean, around northern Australia.  This species grows to a length of  TL.

References

luteus
Fish described in 1987